Jilan (also Romanized as Jīlān and Gīlān) is a village in Kalat-e Hay-ye Gharbi Rural District, Bastam District, Shahrud County, Semnan Province, Iran. At the 2006 census, its population was 698, in 178 families.

References 

Populated places in Shahrud County